Rare Earth in Concert is a live album by rock band Rare Earth, which was released as a double-LP in 1971. It contains a 23:33 version of their signature hit "Get Ready", as well as a new studio song: "Nice To Be With You". It was issued a RIAA gold record award.

Track listing

Side one
 "I Just Want to Celebrate" (Nick Zesses, Dino Fekaris)– 4:40
 "Hey, Big Brother" (Nick Zesses, Dino Fekaris)– 7:26
 "Born to Wander" (Tom Baird)– 4:24

Side two
 "Get Ready" (William "Smokey" Robinson)– 23:33
 The unedited performance ran close to an hour

Side three
 "What'd I Say" (Ray Charles)– 6:31
 "Thoughts" (Gilbert Bridges, Peter Hoorelbeke, Edward Guzman, John Persh, Mark Olson, Raymond Monette)— 10:53

Side four
 "(I Know) I'm Losing You" (Cornelius Grant, Edward Holland Jr., Norman Whitfield)— 14:09
 "Nice to Be with You" (Mark Olson, Raymond Monette, Peter Hoorelbeke)— 2:15

Charts

Personnel
Rare Earth
Gil Bridges – woodwinds, backing vocals, percussion, flute
Ray Monette – guitars, backing vocals
Mark Olson – keyboards, backing vocals
John Persh – bass guitar, backing vocals
Pete Rivera – drums, lead vocals, percussion
Ed Guzman – conga, percussion

Credits
Recording engineers: Cal Harris, Nate Jennings, John Lewis, Ken Sands, Bob Olhsson, Orson Lewis, Criteria Recording Company
Technical engineers: Don Boehrat, Gurdev Sandhu, Michael Grace, Don Fostie
Mastering engineer: Russ Terrana
Graphic Supervision: Tom Schlesinger
Art direction: Curtis McNair
Rare Earth photos: Joel Brodsky
Personal manager: Ron Strasner
Special thanks to: Harry Balk, Ralph Terrana
Recorded live at Civic Coliseum, Jacksonville, FL.; Marine Stadium, Miami, FL.; Cornell University, Ithaca, NY; and At The Pharmacy
"Nice to Be with You" recorded at Motown Studios

References

External links
 http://www.discogs.com/Rare-Earth-Rare-Earth-In-Concert/release/507297 Discogs
 http://coverparadise.to/?Module=ViewEntry&ID=100920  CD covers Cover-Paradies

Rare Earth (band) albums
1971 live albums
Motown live albums